Khezerlu is a city in East Azerbaijan Province, Iran.

Khezerlu or Khezerloo may also refer to:
 Khezerlu, Chaldoran, West Azerbaijan Province
 Khezerlu, Showt, West Azerbaijan Province
 Khezerlu Rural District, in East Azerbaijan Province